The 2014 Maine Black Bears football team represented the University of Maine in the 2014 NCAA Division I FCS football season. They were led by 22nd-year head coach Jack Cosgrove and played their home games at Alfond Stadium. They were a member of the Colonial Athletic Association. They finished the season 5–6, 4–4 in CAA play to finish in a four-way tie for fifth place.

Schedule

 Source: Schedule
 *-BBTV affiliates include: WVII, WFVX, WPME, and Fox College Sports.

Ranking movements

References

Maine
Maine Black Bears football seasons
Maine Black Bears football